Mario Vanarelli (1917–2005) was an Argentine art director.

Selected filmography
 Back in the Seventies (1945)
 Two Angels and a Sinner (1945)
 Where Words Fail (1946)
 From Man to Man (1949)
 The New Bell (1950)
 The Earring (1951)
 Love Never Dies (1955)
 The Candidate (1959)

References

Bibliography
 Peter Cowie & Derek Elley. World Filmography: 1967. Fairleigh Dickinson University Press, 1977.

External links

1917 births
2005 deaths
Argentine art directors
People from Buenos Aires
Argentine people of Italian descent